Parnassius cardinal, the cardinal Apollo, is a high-altitude butterfly which is found in north Afghanistan and Tajikistan. It is a member of the snow Apollo genus (Parnassius) of the swallowtail family (Papilionidae). The species was first described by Grigory Grum-Grshimailo in 1887.

P. cardinal which was described as a species was for many years thought to be a subspecies of Parnassius delphius but it is a distinct species.

Description

Note: The wing pattern in Parnassius species is inconsistent and the very many subspecies and forms make identification problematic and uncertain. Structural characters derived from the genitalia, wing venation, sphragis and foretibial epiphysis are more, but not entirely reliable. The description given here is a guide only. For an identification key see Ackery P.R. (1975).

A magnificent form [of delphius], profusely marked with black, the deep red ocelli of hindwing enlarged, their black borders connected by a broad bar; the females usually darker, with more extended pattern. On hindwing
below large red basal spots and a red-centred hindmarginal spot.

References

Stshetkin, Ju.Ju. 1979. The species status of Parnassius cardinal Gr.Gr. and a new subspecies of Parnassius delphius Ev. (Lepidoptera: Papilionidae). Doklady Akademii Nauk Tadzhikskoi SSR, 22 (2): 63-66.(in Russian)
Weiss, J.-C. 1992. The Parnassiinae of the World. Part 2. Sciences Nat, Venette; 87 pp.

Further reading
sv:Parnassius cardinal Swedish Wikipedia provides further references and synonymy

External links
Rusinsects
Global Butterfly Information System Images of nominate  ssp. djamila Eisner & Naumann, 1980 ssp. noxinfernus Eisner & Naumann, 1980

cardinal
Butterflies described in 1887